Pamela Balch is the 18th president of West Virginia Wesleyan College in Buckhannon, West Virginia. Balch is a 1971 graduate of West Virginia Wesleyan College, and was the unanimous choice as the eighteenth president of the college by the Board of Trustees.

Balch has spent 28 years in higher education and came to Wesleyan after serving as president of Mayville State University, North Dakota. Prior to Mayville, the Uniontown, Pennsylvania, native was the Vice President for Academic Affairs and Dean of the Faculty at Bethany College in West Virginia, Vice Provost for Academic Planning at California State University, Chico, and Associate Dean for Academic Affairs at San Diego State University, Imperial Valley Campus.

She served as the director of Wesleyan’s graduate programs in education from 1985–88 and was a member of the education faculty at the college from 1978-88. Her professional career began as a public school teacher in West Virginia.

References 

Heads of universities and colleges in the United States
West Virginia Wesleyan College alumni
Living people
Year of birth missing (living people)
California State University, Chico faculty
San Diego State University faculty
Bethany College (West Virginia) faculty
People from Buckhannon, West Virginia